This is a list of Georgia State University people. Georgia State University is an urban research university in downtown Atlanta, Georgia, United States. Founded in 1913, it serves a diverse population of approximately 50,000 students, and is one of the University System of Georgia's four research universities.  The current university president is M. Brian Blake.

Notable alumni
 ABRA, musician, actress
Yolo Akili, activist, writer, and emotional health advocate
 Amalia Amaki, artist and art historian
 Sandra Lynn Barnes, educator, sociologist and author
 Foley Beach, archbishop of the Anglican Church in North America
 Lakeyta Bonnette-Bailey, academic
 Keisha Lance Bottoms, former Mayor of Atlanta
 Coy Bowles, musician, Zac Brown Band
 David Brown, former host of public radio show Marketplace
 John Burke, Grammy-nominated pianist and composer
 Max Burns, former Congressman, Georgia 12th District
 Ann-Marie Campbell, President, Southern Division, The Home Depot 
 Joey Cape, musician, Lagwagon
 Benita Carr, photographer
 Dru Castro, musician, Grammy winner
 Joyce Chandler - Former educator and member of the Georgia House of Representatives. 
 Brad Cohen, teacher and author of Front of the Class: How Tourette Syndrome Made Me the Teacher I Never Had
 Kat Cole, COO of Cinnabon
 Lanard Copeland, former NBA player, later famous for playing in the National Basketball League (Australia)
 Paul Coverdell, late US Senator from Georgia (attended)
Daffney, professional wrestler
 Shamari DeVoe, lead singer of Blaque
 Amy Dumas, professional wrestler better known by her ring name Lita (attended)
 William DuVall, lead singer of Alice in Chains
 Malika Redmond, activist and non-profit director
Rubi Rose, American rapper, was a model who featured in Migos video, now famous for her song Big Mouth.
 Douglas Edwards, America's first network news anchor
 William M. Fields, primatologist
 Louie Giglio, pastor, author
 Predrag Gosta, conductor and artistic director 
 Tamyra Gray, actress, musician
 Matthew Hilger, professional poker player and author
 Kim Hoeckele, artist
 Mary Hood, author
 Hank Huckaby, Georgia Representative and Chancellor of the University System of Georgia
 Jerry Huckaby, former U.S. Representative from Louisiana's 5th congressional district, received a Master of Business Administration degree
 RJ Hunter, professional basketball player
 Henry Jenkins, Director, MIT Comparative Media Studies
 Jan Jones, Speaker Pro Tempore in the Georgia State Legislature
 Simran Judge, American-Indian model and actor
 Maya Kalle-Bentzur (born 1958), Israeli Olympic runner and long jumper
 John C. Knapp, President of Washington & Jefferson College
 Farooq Kperogi, journalist, media scholar at Kennesaw State University
 Lance Krall, actor
 Ken Lewis, CEO of Bank of America
 Anya Liftig, performance artist
 Sean Linkenback, author
 Ludacris, musician, actor
 Wil Lutz, NFL player
 Sheryl McCollum, professor, crime analyst, non-profit founder/director
 Corrina Sephora Mensoff, artist
 Jere Morehead, 22nd and current president of the University of Georgia
Sharlotte Neely, anthropologist, author, and expert on the Cherokees 
 Rodger Nishioka, professor of Christian education
 Sam Massell, former mayor of Atlanta
 Amber Nash, comedian and actress, provides the voice of Pam Poovey on Archer
 Rusty Paul, 2nd Mayor of Sandy Springs, Georgia
 Jody Powell, White House Press Secretary, 1977–1980
 Lockett Pundt, guitarist for Deerhunter
 Brad Raffensperger, Georgia Secretary of State during the 2020 United States presidential election
 Marco Restrepo, musician 
 Glenn Richardson, former Speaker, Georgia House of Representatives
 Julia Roberts, actress (attended)  
 Bryant Rogowski, former professional wrestler who used the stage name Bryant Anderson
 Sue Savage-Rumbaugh, primatologist at GSU's Language Research Centre
 Adam Schultz, Chief Official White House Photographer 
 Charles Shapiro, former ambassador to Venezuela, Deputy Assistant Secretary at the US State Department
 Caleb Spivak, actor, model, and entrepreneur
 Andy Stanley, church planter, pastor, and author
 Todd Starnes, author
 Ray Stevens, musician
 Sarah Tiana, comedian, actress
 Will Turpin, bassist for Collective Soul
 Beth Van Fleet, AVP beach volleyball professional player
 Lynn Westmoreland, United States Representative
 Walter Lee Williams, historian, author, and Former FBI Ten Most Wanted Fugitive arrested for sexual acts with underage boys and possession of erotic paraphernalias related to child pornography.
 Albert Wilson, NFL player

Notable faculty
 Carole Hill, American anthropologist and former professor
 Arun Rai, Editor-in-Chief of Management Information Systems Quarterly
 Raffi Besalyan, pianist
 David Bottoms, Georgia's Poet Laureate
 Virginia Spencer Carr, biographer
 Nancy Grace, former prosecutor and current host on CourtTV and CNN (former instructor, no current appointment at GSU)
 Beth Gylys, poet
 Asa Hilliard
 Colleen McEdwards, anchor on CNN International
 Donald Ratajczak, economist
 Akinyele Umoja
 Robert Scott Thompson
 Vijay Vaishnavi, computer information systems researcher and scholar
 Deborah Duchon, Anthropologist and Food Network personality

References

External links
 GSU official website

Georgia State University people